Groupe Scolaire Marie Reine Rwaza is a Catholic boarding secondary school, located in the Musanze District in the Northem Province of Rwanda. The school was established in 1986 and its motto is "Discipline, Knowledge and Holiness".

History 
The school was formed in 1986 under the name “Groupe Scolaire Marie Reine APEDI Rwaza” by an association of people from the same region. The association was called “Association pour la Promotion de l’Education et le Développement Intégré-APEDI”. In 2011, the management changed and now the school is under the direction of the Ruhengeri Catholic Diocese.

Campus 
The campus has the capacity to host 750 boarding students. It contains: 18 classrooms, a library, a computer laboratory, a science laboratory, a refectory, multi-purpose hall, 5 dormitories, 2 Basketball and 3 Volleyball grounds, a Football ground.

Organization and administration 
Groupe Scolaire Marie Reine Rwaza is governed by priests and a board, both appointed by The Ruhengeri Catholic Diocese Bishop. The staff include: 1 Headmaster, 1 Bursar, 1 Head of Study, 1 Head of Discipline, 1 Secretary, 20 Teaching staff, 1 Lab Technician, 1 ICT Technician, 1 Librarian and 5 Supporting staff.

Academics 
Since its establishment in 1986, the school has delivered 1330 degrees.

References

External links 
 Official website
 Ruhengeri Catholic Diocese

Catholic secondary schools in Rwanda
1986 establishments in Rwanda
Educational institutions established in 1986